The 2019 Rugby Europe Women's Sevens Grand Prix Series was the 2019 edition of Rugby Europe's annual rugby sevens season. The top placing non-core teams advanced to the 2020 Hong Kong Women's Sevens qualification tournament, and the two teams with the fewest points were relegated to the 2020 Trophy tournament. The Marcoussis leg of the tournament also served as a qualifier to the European qualifiers for the 2020 Summer Olympics, where seven teams aside from Wales and Scotland advanced.

Schedule

Standings

Marcoussis

All times in Central European Summer Time (UTC+02:00)

Pool Stage

Pool A

Pool B

Pool C

Knockout stage

9th Place

5th Place

Cup

Kharkiv

All times in Eastern European Summer Time (UTC+03:00)

Pool Stage

Pool A

Pool B

Pool C

Knockout stage

9th Place

5th Place

Cup

External links
 Tournament page

References

2019
2019 rugby sevens competitions
International women's rugby union competitions hosted by France
2019
2019 in French women's sport
2019 in Ukrainian sport
Sport in Essonne
Sport in Kharkiv